"Feelin' Alright" is a song by Canadian alternative rock group Len from their third studio album, You Can't Stop the Bum Rush (1999). It was released as the second single from the album on October 19, 1999, by the Work Group. The song was written by Marc Costanzo, Derek MacKenzie, Sharon Costanzo, Michael Bruce, and Spencer Lynn Kirkpatrick, whilst production was helmed by Marc under the stage name Mumble C. "Feelin' Alright" embodies portions of Hydra's 1974 song "Let Me Down Easy" and features a guitar solo from Poison guitarist C.C. DeVille.

"Feelin' Alright" received positive reviews from music critics, who praised the song's heavy metal influences. The song was recorded and mixed at Four Ways Studios in Los Angeles, California, making it the only song on You Can't Stop the Bum Rush that was not recorded at Marc's home studio. An alternative rock song with heavy metal influences, "Feelin' Alright" features Marc and Sharon trading lead vocals. An accompanying music video was directed by Marc, featuring scenes of the group at Leaside High School. DeVille and Danny Masterson both make appearances in the video.

Background and release
"Feelin' Alright" was written by Marc Costanzo, Derek MacKenzie, Sharon Costanzo, Michael Bruce, and Spencer Lynn Kirkpatrick. The song was conceived from a guitar sample that Marc had previously put together, sampling portions of Hydra's "Let Me Down Easy". In an interview with The Denver Post, Sharon referred to the song's recording process as "magic," further commenting that "[i]t's the only song we didn't record at home ... We went to L.A. and sat in the studio and drank scotch and put the song together. There was a deadair part where nothing was happening - we didn't feel like we needed to put vocals there, and you couldn't scratch there." In regards to the guitar solo in the bridge, Len initially reached out to Eddie Van Halen who was unable to do so. The group then reached out to Slash, although he was unable to perform on the song due to time restraints. The recording studio receptionist later suggested C.C. DeVille to the group, who arrived at the studio two hours later and played the solo in two minutes.

Len and the Work Group initially faced difficulty in deciding upon a follow-up single to "Steal My Sunshine". Reflecting on this process, Marc commented: "[W]e knew there was no other single [from You Can't Stop the Bum Rush]. We were surprised there was even one single." On July 31, 1999, it was reported that "Feelin' Alright" was in talks to be the next single from the album with a tentative September release date. "Feelin' Alright" was ultimately released to alternative radio on October 19, 1999. In a stark contrast to its predecessor, "Steal My Sunshine," the song failed to chart on any music charts.

Critical reception
Tony Scherman of The New York Times praised the song, citing it as an appealing attempt at "heavy metal". Also from The New York Times, Ann Powers compared the song's lyrical content to The Offspring in addition to citing the song as a "probable single" from You Can't Stop the Bum Rush. Ron Harris of the Associated Press noted the influence of "early 1980s glam rock" on the song, further referring to it as a "rote, four-chord" track. Richard Harrington of The Washington Post referred to "Feelin' Alright" as a "metal tune," highlighting C.C. DeVille's guest appearance on the song.

Music video

Background
The music video was directed by frontman Marc Costanzo at Leaside High School in Toronto, Canada. The video features guest appearances from Danny Masterson and C.C. DeVille, who performs the guitar solo in the cafeteria.

Synopsis
The video opens with Marc at home having breakfast with D Rock and a little girl dressed as a fairy. Marc and the girl argue over whether or not Marc will be late for school, shortly before Marc realizes that he missed the school bus. As the song begins, the video cuts to various shots of students arriving at their high school. The video then cuts to Marc as he sings and walks through the school hallway with the other Len group members, before they meet Sharon in their chemistry class. Once the first chorus begins, the video cuts to students chatting and trading notes in the cafeteria, before focusing on Sharon and other girls primping in the restroom. As C.C. DeVille's guitar solo begins, he is seen playing an electric guitar on the cafeteria tables. As the post-chorus begins, Sharon sings while walking along the sidelines of the gymnasium, where cheerleaders and wrestlers are practicing. Once Marc begins to sing the bridge, the video cuts to the Len group members fooling around in the hallways. During the final chorus, Marc and his friends are shown hanging out on the front entrance steps to the school. As the final post-chorus begins, the video intercuts between scenes of students chatting in the hallways, Marc boarding the school bus, and Sharon driving home with her friends.

In popular culture
"Feelin' Alright" was featured in Daria during the February 25, 2000 episode "Partner's Complaint".

Track listings and formats
 CD single
 "Feelin' Alright" (Single Edit) – 3:52
 "Feelin' Alright" (Dust Brothers Remix) – 3:38
 "Feelin' Alright" (The Wiseguys Remix) – 6:24
 12" vinyl
 "Feelin' Alright" (Dust Brothers Mix) – 4:32
 "Feelin' Alright" (Extended LP Edit) – 6:30
 "Feelin' Alright" (Dust Brothers Instrumental) – 4:32
 "Man of the Year"  – 5:07
 "Feelin' Alright" (Bonus Beats) 
 Digital download
 "Feelin' Alright" (Single Edit) – 3:42
 "Feelin' Alright" (Dust Brothers Remix) – 3:42
 "Feelin' Alright" (Extended LP Edit) – 6:24

Credits and personnel
Credits and personnel are adapted from the You Can't Stop the Bum Rush album liner notes.
 Marc Costanzo – vocals, writer, producer
 Derek MacKenzie – writer
 Sharon Costanzo – vocals, writer
 Michael Bruce – writer
 Spencer Lynn Kirkpatrick – writer
 C.C. DeVille – guitar solo & slide
 Larry Ciancia – drums
 John X – mixing, engineering
 David Mitson – mastering

Release history

References

External links
 

1999 singles
1999 songs
Epic Records singles
Len (band) songs